Christopher Daniel Zeischegg, formerly known as Danny Wylde, is an American writer, musician, filmmaker, and former pornographic actor.

Early life
Danny Wylde was born on October 21, 1985 in Alameda County, California. As a teenager, he attended hardcore punk shows and shortly afterward became straight edge. Wylde completed six years of undergraduate study.

Pornographic career and advocacy
Wylde, "had done my first porn scene when I was 19." He has appeared in straight, gay and bisexual pornographic films.

Wylde contributed the essay "Our Pornography" to The Feminist Porn Book: The Politics of Producing Pleasure, a collection of essays written by feminist porn scholars and feminists in the adult film industry. Wylde and his girlfriend, fellow porn star Lily Labeau, contributed a film of themselves having sex to the website MakeLoveNotPorn, which aims to "provide more realistic information about human sexuality than that provided by hardcore pornography". The couple later appeared on The Jeff Probst Show with MakeLoveNotPorn founder Cindy Gallop to discuss the site.

More recently, Wylde has been active in opposing Measure B, which requires all porn stars to wear condoms during vaginal and anal sex scenes filmed in Los Angeles County. In April 2013, he appeared alongside fellow pornographic actor Steven St. Croix to debate the measure on a HuffPost Live discussion panel.

Non-pornographic career

Film
In addition to his adult film career, Wylde also produces and directs non-pornographic films. Some of these include Frisk, Nuclear, and Death and Sportsbras, all of which starred Guy Perry. Nuclear and another of his films, The Extraordinary Monday of Herman Brumby, have been screened at festivals.

Music
Wylde previously played in tech-metal bands Heuristic and Datura before becoming one half of the synthetic metal band Chiildren, his current project, alongside fellow porn star Chad Fjerstad (also known as Vin Vericose in the adult industry). The band is signed with Bit Riot Records, and has released one EP entitled The Other People. On the influence of pornography on their music, Fjerstad stated:
Sex and our lifestyle play a huge role in the lyrics, and I’m sure subconsciously in the mood of the music as well. The whole concept of [our debut album] ‘The Other People’ is about the separation we feel from everyone who is a non-sex-industry worker. When we go out, we observe the actions and behaviors of the majority of people, and it makes us feel very alien. ‘Milos’ is inspired by the extremely controversial ‘A Serbian Film,’ which is about an ex-pornstar thrown into a nightmarish snuff-world. We both found quite a bit of influence in that film. All of our stuff is littered with sex and violence — we can’t really escape it. At least not at this point in our lives.
Chiildren has released two music videos to date, for their tracks "My Gods" and "Girl in the Dirt".

Writing
Wylde has published three full-length novels, Come to My Brother (2013), The Wolves That Live in Skin and Space (2015), and The Magician (2020). He also released a collection of writings, Body to Job, in 2018.

He maintains a regular blog, Trve West Coast Fiction, where he chronicles his life largely outside of his career in pornography. Additionally, his written works have been featured on Smitten Kitten Online and the Bibliophile Érotique by Darling House blog, among other platforms.

Personal life
Zeischegg is married to Maggie West, a photographer and artist.

Awards and nominations

AVN Awards

Further reading
 "A Male Porn Star Discovers Leaving Porn Is Harder Than You'd Think", Forbes (February 21, 2017)
 "Danny Wylde: Former Porn Star on Pay, the 'Stigma' of Doing Both Gay and Straight Scenes and Why He Left the Industry", The Independent (March 6, 2017)
 "Danny Wylde: Ex-Porn Actor Christopher Zeischegg on Why #MeToo Should Include Sex Workers", Newsweek (February 21, 2018)

References

External links

Chiildren official website

1985 births
Male pornographic film actors
American actors in gay pornographic films
American male pornographic film actors
Bisexual male pornographic film actors
Living people
21st-century American LGBT people
People from Los Angeles County, California
Male actors from Los Angeles County, California